Mũ Phốc Đầu is derived from the Chinese Futou (襆頭). It was formal wear for Vietnamese mandarin officials. It is the predecessor to the mũ cánh chuồn or also called mũ ô sa, which was derived from the Chinese Wushamao (烏紗帽).

Gallery

Vietnamese culture
Vietnamese headgear